Habibar Rahman (born 31 January 1945) is a Bangladesh Awami League politician and the incumbent member of parliament from Bogra-5. He was elected as a member of parliament in 2018 as a candidate of Bangladesh Awami League.

Early life
Rahman was passed HSC in 1962 from Government Azizul Haque College. He completed his graduation & post graduation from Rajshahi University in Economics. After completed his studies, he joined the Police service.

Career
Rahman was elected to Parliament from Bogra-5 on 5 January 2014 as a Bangladesh Awami League candidate. He is an agriculture-based businessman and retired police officer. Rahman is actively involved in politics. He is the third elected member of parliament.

References

Awami League politicians
Living people
1945 births
9th Jatiya Sangsad members
10th Jatiya Sangsad members
11th Jatiya Sangsad members
Bangladeshi politicians